The Fifth ARMM Regional Legislative Assembly was a meeting of the unicameral regional legislature of the Autonomous Region in Muslim Mindanao. The convening of the 5th Regional Legislative Assembly follows the 2005 ARMM elections, which replaced the entire membership of the Regional Legislative Assembly.

Members

See also
Autonomous Region in Muslim Mindanao
ARMM Regional Legislative Assembly

References

ARMM Regional Legislative Assembly by legislative period